The June 22, 1963 race at Road America, at Elkhart Lake, WI was the sixth racing event of the thirteenth season of the Sports Car Club of America's National Sports Car Championship. 

A&B Production Results

References

External links
World Sports Racing Protoytypes
RacingSportsCars.com
June Sprints